Karin Geiger is a photographer born in 1966 Dortmund, Germany.

Education 
She completed her Master of Fine Arts at the University of British Columbia in 1997.

Select exhibitions 
Geiger's 1997 solo exhibition at the Vancouver Or Gallery entitled Karin Geiger: Plus Toys and Poster Boys consists of 23 photographs from a series called In Between (1997). The series was expanded and exhibited in 2003 at the Stadtmuseum Münster with a catalogue essay by Sarah Thornton.

References

External links 
A selection of Geiger's work

1966 births
Living people
University of British Columbia alumni
Photographers from North Rhine-Westphalia
Artists from Dortmund